The  or PND (translated as Name Authority File) is an authority file of people, which served primarily to access literature in libraries. The PND has been built up between 1995 and 1998 and was published by the German National Library (DNB) until 2012. For each person there is a record with his or her name, birth and occupation connected with a unique identifier, the PND number.

The PND comprises more than two million entries and is comparable with the Library of Congress Name Authority File (LCNAF).

For the exchange of name records, there is a separate machine exchange format for libraries called MAB-PND.

See also
 Library of Congress

Further reading 
 
 
 
 
 
 
 
  (5 pages)

External links 
 Information pages of the DNB about the PND (Wayback Machine)

1995 establishments in Germany
2012 disestablishments in Germany
Library cataloging and classification
Identifiers